The eleventh series of the British medical drama television series Holby City commenced airing in the United Kingdom on BBC One on 21 October 2008, and concluded on 13 October 2009.

Episodes

Cast

Main characters 
James Anderson as Oliver Valentine (from episode 34)
Rakie Ayola as Kyla Tyson (until episode 8)
Paul Bradley as Elliot Hope

Tom Chambers as Sam Strachan (until episode 10)
Hari Dhillon as Michael Spence
Rebecca Grant as Daisha Anderson
Tina Hobley as Chrissie Williams (episodes 1-2, from episode 19)
Jaye Jacobs as Donna Jackson
Patsy Kensit as Faye Byrne

Rosie Marcel as Jac Naylor
Amanda Mealing as Connie Beauchamp
Duncan Pow as Linden Cullen
Robert Powell as Mark Williams
Hugh Quarshie as Ric Griffin
Luke Roberts as Joseph Byrne
Phoebe Thomas as Maria Kendall

Recurring characters 
Ayesha Antoine as Rachel Baptiste (episodes 5−29)
Leslie Ash as Vanessa Lytton (from episode 52)
Roger Barclay as Terence Cunningham (from episode 41)
Benedick Blythe as John Grayson
Dominic Colchester as Jamie Norton (until episode 6)
Stella Gonet as Jayne Grayson (until episode 46)
Andrew Lewis as Paul Rose
Alex Macqueen as Keith Greene
Niamh McGrady as Mary-Claire Carter (from episode 49)
Alan Morrissey as Nicky van Barr (from episode 37)
Anna-Louise Plowman as Annalese Carson (episodes 3−38)
Riann Steele as Lauren Minster (from episode 33)

Guest characters 
Oliver Boot as Ben Woodman (episodes 20−35)
Ade Edmondson as Abra Durant (episode 8)
Holly Lucas as Martha Hope (episodes 20−36)
Meera Syal as Tara Sodi (episodes 36−44)
Peter Wingfield as Dan Clifford (episode 25)

References

11
2008 British television seasons
2009 British television seasons